Potter Island is an uninhabited island located in the Arctic Archipelago within the Qikiqtaaluk Region of Nunavut. It is a Baffin Island offshore island situated in Frobisher Bay. It is north of Lower Savage Islands, and northwest of Resolution Island and Edgell Island.

References 

Uninhabited islands of Qikiqtaaluk Region
Islands of Frobisher Bay